Saoek Sitchefboontham is a Thai Muay Thai fighter.

Muay thai career
On November 1, 2019, Saoek fought Eisaku Ogasawara at KNOCK OUT 2019 BREAKING DAWN in his first fight outside of Thailand. He won the bout by a second round head kick.

On February 13, 2020, Saoek won his first major muay thai title, as he captured the Rajadamnern Stadium super bantamweight title with a decision win against Thepthaksin Sor.Sornsing.

On October 28, 2021, it was announced that Saoek and his brother Saotho had their contracts bought out by Petchyindee.

Titles and accomplishments

 2020 Rajadamnern Stadium 122 lbs Champion
 2022 True4U 118 lbs Champion

Fight record

|-  style="background:#cfc;"
| 2023-02-23|| Win ||align=left| Yokmorakot Wor.Sangprapai || Petchyindee, Rajadamnern Stadium|| Bangkok, Thailand || Decision ||5 ||3:00

|-  style="background:#cfc;"
| 2022-11-18 || Win ||align=left| Petchpailin SorJor.Tongprachin || Ruamponkon + Prachin || Prachinburi province, Thailand || TKO (Doctor stoppage) ||4 ||
|-  style="background:#c5d2ea;"
| 2022-10-20 || Draw ||align=left| Diesellek BuildJC || Petchyindee, Rajadamnern Stadium || Bangkok, Thailand || Decision || 5 || 3:00

|-  style="background:#cfc;"
| 2022-09-09|| Win ||align=left| Longern Dabransarakham || Muaymanwasuk, Rajadamnern Stadium|| Bangkok, Thailand || Decision ||5 ||3:00

|-  style="background:#cfc;"
| 2022-07-05|| Win ||align=left| Kumandoi PetchyindeeAcademy || Muaymansananmuang, Rangsit Stadium|| Bangkok, Thailand || Decision ||5 ||3:00
|-
! style=background:white colspan=9 |

|-  style="background:#cfc;"
| 2022-05-12 || Win ||align=left| Petchsila Wor.Auracha ||Petchyindee, Rajadamnern Stadium || Bangkok, Thailand || Decision (Unanimous) || 5 || 3:00
|-
! style=background:white colspan=9 |
|-  style="background:#fbb;"
| 2022-03-17|| Loss||align=left| Diesellek PetchyindeeAcademy || Petchyindee, Rajadamnern Stadium || Bangkok, Thailand || Decision || 5 ||3:00 
|-
! style=background:white colspan=9 |

|-  style="background:#cfc;"
| 2021-12-03|| Win||align=left| Petchpailin Sor.Jor.Tongprachin || Muaymanwansuk || Buriram Province, Thailand || Decision|| 5||3:00

|-  style="background:#cfc;"
| 2021-11-05||Win ||align=left| Kumandoi PetchyindeeAcademy || Muaymanwansuk || Buriram Province, Thailand || Decision ||5 ||3:00
|-  style="background:#cfc;"
| 2021-04-08|| Win ||align=left| Puenkon Tor.Surat || Mahakam Muay Ruam PonKon Chana + Petchyindee|| Songkhla province, Thailand || Decision || 5 || 3:00
|-  style="background:#c5d2ea;"
| 2021-03-15 || Draw ||align=left| Kumandoi Petcharoenvit || Chef Boontham, Rangsit Stadium || Rangsit, Thailand || Decision || 5 || 3:00
|-  style="background:#cfc"
| 2020-11-07 || Win||align=left| Kumandoi Petcharoenvit || SAT HERO SERIES, World Siam Stadium || Bangkok, Thailand || TKO (Doctor Stop/Cut) || 4||
|-  style="background:#fbb;"
| 2020-10-05|| Loss||align=left| Ronachai Tor.Ramintra ||  R1 UFA, World Siam Stadium || Bangkok, Thailand ||Decision ||5 ||3:00
|-  style="background:#cfc;"
| 2020-09-01|| Win||align=left| Kumandoi Petcharoenvit || ChefBoontham, Thanakorn Stadium || Nakhon Pathom Province, Thailand || Decision || 5 || 3:00
|-  style="background:#cfc;"
| 2020-07-27|| Win ||align=left| Petchsamarn Sor.SamarnGarment || ChefBoontham, Thanakorn Stadium || Nakhon Pathom province, Thailand || Decision || 5 || 3:00
|-  style="background:#cfc;"
| 2020-02-13|| Win||align=left| Thepthaksin Sor.Sornsing || ChefBoontham, Rajadamnern Stadium || Bangkok, Thailand || Decision|| 5 || 3:00
|-
! style=background:white colspan=9 |
|-  style="background:#cfc;"
| 2019-12-23|| Win||align=left| Diesellek Wor.Wanchai || ChefBoontham + Rajadamnern Stadium Anniversary || Bangkok, Thailand || Decision|| 5 || 3:00
|-  style="background:#cfc;"
| 2019-11-01|| Win||align=left| Eisaku Ogasawara || KNOCK OUT 2019 BREAKING DAWN || Tokyo, Japan || KO (High Kick)|| 2 || 2:29
|-  style="background:#cfc;"
| 2019-09-09|| Win||align=left| Saensak Sor.Boonyiem || Chujaroen Muay Thai, Rajadamnern Stadium || Bangkok, Thailand || KO || 4 ||
|-  style="background:#fbb;"
| 2019-07-29|| Loss||align=left| Samingdam MiamiCondoBangpu || Sor.Sommai, Rajadamnern Stadium || Bangkok, Thailand || Decision|| 5 || 3:00
|-  style="background:#fbb;"
| 2019-04-25|| Loss||align=left| Petchbankaek Sor.Sommai || Sor.Sommai, Rajadamnern Stadium || Bangkok, Thailand || Decision|| 5 || 3:00
|-  style="background:#cfc;"
| 2019-03-15|| Win||align=left| Phetboonsung Phetjinda ||  Rajadamnern Stadium || Bangkok, Thailand || Decision|| 5 || 3:00
|-  style="background:#cfc;"
| 2019-01-23|| Win||align=left| Petchtamaew Sor.Satra || Chujaroen Muay Thai, Rajadamnern Stadium || Bangkok, Thailand || Decision|| 5 || 3:00
|-  style="background:#fbb;"
| 2018-12-24|| Loss||align=left| Petchbankaek Sor.Sommai || Bangrachan, Rajadamnern Stadium || Bangkok, Thailand || Decision|| 5 || 3:00
|-  style="background:#fbb;"
| 2018-11-29|| Loss||align=left| Berkban Ansukhumvit || Sor.Sommai, Rajadamnern Stadium || Bangkok, Thailand || Decision|| 5 || 3:00
|-  style="background:#fbb;"
| 2018-10-11|| Loss||align=left| Padetsuek Gor.Kampanat || Sitchefboontham, Rajadamnern Stadium || Bangkok, Thailand || Decision|| 5 || 3:00
|-  style="background:#fbb;"
| 2018-09-06|| Loss||align=left| Padetsuek Gor.Kampanat || Sitchefboontham, Rajadamnern Stadium || Bangkok, Thailand || Decision|| 5 || 3:00
|-  style="background:#cfc;"
| 2018-08-02|| Win ||align=left| Padetsuek Gor.Kampanat || Sitchefboontham, Rajadamnern Stadium || Bangkok, Thailand || Decision|| 5 || 3:00
|-  style="background:#cfc;"
| 2018-05-14|| Win ||align=left| Prakaipetch Nitisamui || Tor.Chaiwat, Rajadamnern Stadium || Bangkok, Thailand || Decision|| 5 || 3:00
|-  style="background:#fbb;"
| 2018-04-05|| Loss||align=left| Metee Sor.Jor.Toipaedriw || Sor.Sommai, Rajadamnern Stadium || Bangkok, Thailand || Decision|| 5 || 3:00
|-  style="background:#cfc;"
| 2018-03-14|| Win ||align=left| Samingdam MiamiCondoBangpu || Tor.Chaiwat, Rajadamnern Stadium || Bangkok, Thailand || Decision|| 5 || 3:00
|-  style="background:#fbb;"
| 2018-01-25|| Loss||align=left| Padetsuek Gor.Kampanat || Tor.Chaiwat, Rajadamnern Stadium || Bangkok, Thailand || Decision|| 5 || 3:00
|-  style="background:#cfc;"
| 2017-12-21|| Win||align=left| Rambong Leesawgarnka || Sor.Sommai + Chefboontham, Rajadamnern Stadium || Bangkok, Thailand || Decision|| 5 || 3:00
|-  style="background:#fbb;"
| 2017-08-31|| Loss ||align=left| Kongthoranee Sor.Sommai || Petchaophraya, Rajadamnern Stadium ||Bangkok, Thailand || KO (left elbow) || 4 ||
|-  style="background:#fbb;"
| 2017-07-31|| Loss ||align=left| Phetrung Nayokkaipedriew ||  Rajadamnern Stadium || Bangkok, Thailand || Decision|| 5 || 3:00
|-  style="background:#fbb;"
| 2017-06-05|| Loss ||align=left| Rungnarai Kiatmuu9 || Rajadamnern Stadium || Bangkok, Thailand || Decision || 5 || 3:00
|-  style="background:#cfc;"
| 2017-05-05|| Win ||align=left| Kiew Parunchai || Lumpinee Stadium || Bangkok, Thailand || Decision || 5 || 3:00
|-  style="background:#cfc;"
| 2017-03-30|| Win||align=left| Gingsanglek Tor.Laksong || Rajadamnern Stadium || Bangkok, Thailand || Decision|| 5 || 3:00
|-  style="background:#cfc;"
| 2017-02-09|| Win||align=left| Gingsanglek Tor.Laksong || Rajadamnern Stadium || Bangkok, Thailand || Decision|| 5 || 3:00
|-  style="background:#cfc;"
| 2016-12-22|| Win||align=left| Oley Tor.Laksong || Rajadamnern Stadium || Bangkok, Thailand || Decision|| 5 || 3:00
|-  style="background:#cfc;"
| 2016-11-16|| Win||align=left| Kongsak Sor.Satra ||  || Bangkok, Thailand || KO|| 5 ||
|-  style="background:#cfc;"
| 2016-09-15|| Win||align=left| Thanadej Tor.Phran49 || Rajadamnern Stadium || Bangkok, Thailand || Decision|| 5 || 3:00
|-  style="background:#cfc;"
| 2016-08-10|| Win||align=left| Detchaiya Petchyindee || Rajadamnern Stadium || Bangkok, Thailand || Decision|| 5 || 3:00
|-  style="background:#cfc;"
| 2016-07-04|| Win||align=left| Chatploy Sor.Phulusawat || Rajadamnern Stadium || Bangkok, Thailand || Decision|| 5 || 3:00
|-  style="background:#cfc;"
| 2016-05-12|| Win||align=left| Phetthanakit JSP || Rajadamnern Stadium || Bangkok, Thailand || Decision|| 5 || 3:00
|-  style="background:#cfc;"
| 2016-04-21|| Win||align=left| Phetchiangkwan Nayoksomdet  || Rajadamnern Stadium || Bangkok, Thailand || Decision|| 5 || 3:00
|-  style="background:#cfc;"
| 2016-03-24|| Win ||align=left| Kongthoranee Sor.Sommai || Rajadamnern Stadium ||Bangkok, Thailand || Decision || 5 || 3:00
|-  style="background:#cfc;"
| 2016-02-25|| Win ||align=left| Banchachai Por.Petchsiri || Rajadamnern Stadium ||Bangkok, Thailand || Decision || 5 || 3:00
|-  style="background:#cfc;"
| 2016-01-18|| Win ||align=left| Kongthoranee Sor.Sommai || Rajadamnern Stadium ||Bangkok, Thailand || Decision || 5 || 3:00
|-  style="background:#fbb;"
| 2015-12-27|| Loss ||align=left| Den Sor.PhetUdon || Ladprao Stadium ||Thailand || Decision || 5 || 3:00
|-  style="background:#cfc;"
| 2015-11-16|| Win ||align=left| Chartser Or.Bor.Tor.Lamphongtami || Rajadamnern Stadium ||Bangkok, Thailand || Decision || 5 || 3:00
|-
| colspan=9 | Legend:    

|-  style="background:#fbb;"
| 2022-05-31|| Loss ||align=left| Ali Kinanah || IFMA Senior World Championships 2022, Quarter Finals|| Abu Dhabi, United Arab Emirates || Decision (Split)|| 3 ||3:00 

|-
| colspan=9 | Legend:

References

Saoek Sitchefboontham
Living people
1997 births